Stanislav Polodna (born April 3, 1989) is a Czech retired professional ice hockey player. He played eleven games with HC České Budějovice in the Czech Extraliga between 2010 and 2013.

References

External links

1989 births
Living people
Bisons de Neuilly-sur-Marne players
Czech ice hockey forwards
Erie Otters players
Motor České Budějovice players
People from Milevsko
IHC Písek players
HC Tábor players
Sportspeople from the South Bohemian Region
Czech expatriate ice hockey players in the United States
Czech expatriate ice hockey players in Sweden
Czech expatriate sportspeople in France
Expatriate ice hockey players in France